Maharaja Sir Meidingngu Churachand , also known as Churachandra or Chura Chand (1886–1941), was a Meitei King and a Maharaja of Kangleipak. He ascended the throne after his predecessor Kulachandra Singh was jailed. He was a 5-year-old boy when he was placed on the throne on 22 September 1891, after the troubles of the Anglo-Manipur War of 1891. In 1907, he was formally declared king, after completing education at Mayo College.

He received the title of Maharaja in 1918 and was knighted as a Knight Commander of the Order of the Star of India in the 1934 New Year Honours, becoming Sir Churachandra Singh.

See also
List of Manipuri kings
Manipur (princely state)
Churachand Singh Trophy, football tournament named after him

References

External links
 Ethel St. Clair Grimwood, My Three Years in Manipur and Escape from the Recent Mutiny (fl.1891)

Meitei royalty
Hindu monarchs
Knights Commander of the Order of the Star of India
1886 births
1941 deaths
Commanders of the Order of the British Empire